Adrianus "Janus" van Merrienboer (8 October 1894 – 12 October 1947) was an archer from the Netherlands. He was born and died in Oud en Nieuw Gastel, North Brabant.

He represented his native country at the 1920 Summer Olympics in Antwerp, Belgium. There he won the gold medal in the Men's Team Event (28 m), alongside Joep Packbiers, Piet de Brouwer, Driekske van Bussel, Jo van Gastel, Tiest van Gestel, Janus Theeuwes, and Theo Willems.

References

External links
 profile

1894 births
1947 deaths
Dutch male archers
Archers at the 1920 Summer Olympics
Olympic archers of the Netherlands
Olympic gold medalists for the Netherlands
Olympic medalists in archery
People from Halderberge
Medalists at the 1920 Summer Olympics
Sportspeople from North Brabant